The Fairfield Stags Men's Ice Hockey was an NCAA Division I ice hockey team that played in the MAAC for five seasons.

History
Fairfield's hockey program was elevated to Division III status in 1974 and found immediate success with a 19-7-1 mark under head coach John McCarthy. Despite being a D-I school, the Stags competed in ECAC's lower classification. McCarthy retired after the 1995-96 season and was replaced by Peter LaVigne who then stepped down after only one season. Mike Doneghey succeeded Lavigne and in Doneghey's first year Fairfield was ruled ineligible to play in ECAC's North/Central/South postseason after offering athletic scholarships, a violation of D-III rules. Fairfield had offered the scholarships because they were joining the newly formed Metro Atlantic Athletic Conference (MAAC) ice hockey conference which was to begin play in 1998-99. In their first year as a full D-I program Fairfield finished with one of the all-time worst records, going 1-31 over the course of the season and allowed an average of more than 7 goals per game. After the worst record in team history Doneghey was promptly replaced with Mark Dennehy and, though there was improvement, Dennehy himself left after a 3-28-3 season to become an assistant at Massachusetts. Jim Hunt assumed the reins for the 2000-01 season and saw to a resurgence in Fairfield's fortunes with an 11-win season, but the next two years saw diminishing returns with 6 and 8 wins.

Hunt was not able to push the Stags any further due to the University dropping the ice hockey program to club status after the 2002-03 season. The move came as a cost-cutting measure that also claimed Fairfield's football program. In five season as a D-I school, Fairfield finished last in their conference three times, made two conference tournaments and lost both of its playoffs games by a combined score of 23-7.

Today the Stags Men's Ice Hockey Team is a member of the ACHA and competes in the D3 division. Under new head coach Mike Silva, the team has seen an Empire Conference Championship in 2015 and three consecutive Regional Championships that vaulted the team into contention for the national title. In 2015 the team achieved a record of 0-3-0 on the national stage, yet still finished ranked 14th in the country. In 2016 the team achieved a record of 1-1-1 at nationals nearly qualifying for the semi-finals, ultimately the team finished 7th in the country that year. In 2017 the team earned a record of 1-2-0 and finished 12th in the country.

Season-by-season records

All-time coaching records

References

 
Ice hockey teams in Connecticut